Syarhey Kavalyuk (born 7 January 1980) is a Belarusian former professional footballer.

External links

 

1980 births
Living people
Belarusian footballers
Association football midfielders
FC Dynamo Brest players
FC Neman Grodno players
FC Torpedo-BelAZ Zhodino players
FC Granit Mikashevichi players
FC Dnepr Mogilev players
FC Vitebsk players
FC Lida players
FC Smorgon players
FC Baranovichi players
FC Smolevichi players
FC Rukh Brest players
Sportspeople from Brest, Belarus